The lawn bowls competition at the 1950 British Empire Games took place in Auckland, New Zealand from 4–11 February 1950.

Medal table

Medallists

Results

Men's singles – round robin

Results

Men's pairs – round robin

Results

Men's fours – round robin

Results

+ Play Offs
Eliminator - South Africa beat New Zealand 22-17
Final - South Africa beat Australia 23-14

References

See also
List of Commonwealth Games medallists in lawn bowls
Lawn bowls at the Commonwealth Games

Lawn bowls at the Commonwealth Games
Brit